Hyundai Corporation is a South Korean company founded in 1976 as part of the Hyundai chaebol.

It is a general trading company providing export and import services with a wide variety of products including marine vessels, industrial plants and machinery, commercial automobiles and rolling stock, steel, chemical products, and general commodities.

Hyundai Corporation owns Qingdao Hyundai Shipbuilding in China. It also owns in partnership with POSCO Pos-Hyundai Steel (steel trading & coil service center) at Irungattukottai near Chennai, India.

It has 32 worldwide offices.

In December 2009, Hyundai Heavy Industries (once a sibling company in Hyundai) purchased a 50% plus-one-share majority stake in Hyundai Corporation, and installed new management on January 1, 2010. 

Hyundai Corporation recorded sales of ₩41,000,000,000,000 in 2001. It was the highest sales in Korea as a company. 
Hyundai Corporation was awarded US$25,000,000,000 Export-Tower Award, due to its export was $25,280,000,000 (1999 July-2000 June).
During the same period, those the company behind Hyundai Corporation such as Samsung, LG, SK, Daewoo recorded its export respectively $22,500,000,000, $12,300,000,000, $5,800,000,000, $5,800,000,000.

Hyundai Corporation's business fields
Trading; Ships, Automobiles, Machinery, Plant, Electric & Electronics, Chemicals, Steel & Metal, Coal, and other raw materials etc.
Project Organization; Power Plants, Roads, Off-Shore Facilities, and Industrial Plants etc.
Resource Development; LNG in Yemen/Oman/Qatar, Coal Mine in Drayton Australia, and 11-2 Gas block in Vietnam etc.
Overseas Investment; Qingdao Hyundai Shipbuilding in China, Inti Industrial Complex in Indonesia, POS-Hyundai Coil Center etc.

External links
 http://www.hyundaicorp.com/en
 http://www.qingdaohyundai.com

Corporation
Companies listed on the Korea Exchange